Stefanie Fee (born March 11, 1990) is an American field hockey player. She began playing in 2002, at the age of 12. She studied at Duke University and graduated in 2012. Her major was psychology with a double minor in Education and Cultural Anthropology. Her parents are Harry Fee and Charlotte Martz. She participated at the 2018 Women's Hockey World Cup.

References

External links
 

1990 births
Living people
American female field hockey players
Duke Blue Devils field hockey players
Field hockey players at the 2016 Summer Olympics
Olympic field hockey players of the United States
Sportspeople from Virginia Beach, Virginia
Female field hockey defenders
Pan American Games medalists in field hockey
Pan American Games gold medalists for the United States
Field hockey players at the 2015 Pan American Games
Medalists at the 2015 Pan American Games